George William Fox Kinnaird, 9th Lord Kinnaird, KT, PC (14 April 1807 – 7 January 1878) was a Scottish Whig politician. He served as Master of the Buckhounds under Lord Melbourne from 1839 to 1841.

Background 
Kinnaird was the eldest son of Charles Kinnaird, 8th Lord Kinnaird, by Lady Olivia Laetitia Catherine FitzGerald third daughter of William FitzGerald, 2nd Duke of Leinster.

Political career 
Kinnaird succeeded his father in the lordship of Kinnaird in 1826. This was a Scottish peerage and did not entitle him to an automatic seat in the House of Lords. However, in 1831 he was created Baron Rossie, of Rossie Priory in the County of Perth, in the Peerage of the United Kingdom, which gave him a seat in the upper chamber of Parliament. In December 1839 he was appointed Master of the Buckhounds under Lord Melbourne, a post he held until the government fell in 1841. He was sworn of the Privy Council in early 1840. In 1857 he was made a Knight of the Thistle. Three years later he was created Baron Kinnaird, of Rossie in the County of Perth, also in the Peerage of the United Kingdom. In contrast to the earlier barony, which was created with normal remainder to heirs male, this barony was created with special remainder to his younger brother, Arthur. Kinnaird later served as Lord Lieutenant of Perthshire from 1866 to 1878.

Family 
Lord Kinnaird married the Honourable Frances Anne Georgina Ponsonby, only daughter of William Ponsonby, 1st Baron de Mauley, at Great Canford, Dorset, on 14 December 1837. They had three children:

Hon. Olivia Barbara Kinnaird (died 1871).
Victor Alexander Kinnaird, Master of Kinnaird (1840–1851).
Charles Fox Kinnaird, Master of Kinnaird (1841–1860).

Lord Kinnaird died in January 1878, aged 70, without surviving male issue. The barony of Rossie became extinct on his death while he was succeeded in the Scottish lordship and barony of Kinnaird by his younger brother, Arthur. Lady Kinnaird died in March 1910, aged 92.

References

External links 

|-

1807 births
1878 deaths
Knights of the Thistle
Lord-Lieutenants of Perthshire
Lords of Parliament
Members of the Privy Council of the United Kingdom
Masters of the Buckhounds
Eldest sons of British hereditary barons
Peers of the United Kingdom created by William IV
Peers of the United Kingdom created by Queen Victoria